Acefluranol (developmental code name BX-591), also known as 2,3-bis(3,4-diacetoxy-5-fluorophenyl)pentane, is a nonsteroidal antiestrogen of the stilbestrol group that was never marketed. It is a polyfluorinated biphenyl that is related to polybrominated and polychlorinated biphenyls and diethylstilbestrol.

See also
 Bifluranol
 Pentafluranol
 Terfluranol

References

Abandoned drugs
Acetate esters
Antiestrogen esters
Antiestrogens
Fluoroarenes
Hormonal antineoplastic drugs